Gregolry Panizo (born 12 May 1985) is a Brazilian former professional road bicycle racer. He competed at the 2012 Summer Olympics in the Men's road race, but failed to finish.

Major results

2007
 2nd Overall Tour de Santa Catarina
1st Stages 5 & 11
 7th Overall Volta de Ciclismo Internacional do Estado de São Paulo
 8th Overall Volta do Paraná
2008
 1st  Overall Volta de Ciclismo Internacional do Estado de São Paulo
2010
 1st  Overall Volta de Ciclismo Internacional do Estado de São Paulo
1st Stage 8
 4th Overall Volta do Paraná
2011
 Pan American Road Championships
1st  Road race
9th Time trial
 2nd 2010–11 UCI America Tour
 3rd Road race, National Road Championships
 5th Overall Volta de Gravataí
2012
 Vuelta a Guatemala
1st Points classification
1st Stage 2
 5th Overall Tour do Brasil
2013
 1st Stage 5 Tour do Rio
2014
 3rd Overall Volta Ciclística Internacional do Rio Grande do Sul
 3rd Overall Volta do Paraná
 4th Overall Tour do Rio
 9th Overall Tour do Brasil

References

External links

Gregory Panizo athlete profile at London2012.com

Brazilian male cyclists
Brazilian road racing cyclists
1985 births
Living people
Sportspeople from Paraná (state)
Olympic cyclists of Brazil
Cyclists at the 2012 Summer Olympics